This is a list of Danish furniture designers. Summary biographies and background on many of the most important players can be found in the Danish modern article which covers Denmark's richest furniture design period.

See also
Danish modern devoted above all to mid-20th century furniture design
Danish design on all aspects of contemporary design

 
Design-related lists
Furniture designers
History of furniture